Cool as Ice is a 1991 American romantic musical comedy film directed by David Kellogg, written by David Stenn and starring rapper Vanilla Ice in his feature film debut. The plot focuses on Johnny Van Owen, a freewheeling, motorcycle-riding rapper who arrives in a small town and meets Kathy, an honor student who catches his eye. Meanwhile, Kathy's father, who is in witness protection, is found by the corrupt police officers he escaped from years ago.

Developed as a vehicle for Vanilla Ice, the film was widely panned by critics, and was a box office bomb, grossing only $1.2 million from a $6 million budget.

Plot
Johnny Van Owen is a rapper who drifts from city to city. Johnny is performing at a nightclub, rapping and dancing with his crew and a club background songstress playing "Cool as Ice (Everybody Get Loose)".

While the group passes through a small town, Johnny falls for honor student Kathy Winslow. The crew is stranded in the town after a member's motorcycle breaks down and has to be left at a local repair shop. While waiting for repairs, Johnny uses the opportunity to see Kathy. She already has a boyfriend named Nick, whom he advises Kathy to dump.

Johnny shows up with his crew at a local club frequented by Kathy and her friends. Noticing that no one was enjoying the live music playing at the club, Johnny and the crew decide to perform a musical number, "People's Choice", by unplugging the other band's instruments and taking control, shocking the audience and ending with Johnny sweeping Kathy off her feet, humiliating Nick.

He offers to forgive Kathy and take her home, but she refuses and walks home by herself. Unbeknownst to Kathy, she is stalked by two strange men in a car. She is saved by Johnny, who takes her home. At the club's parking lot, a jealous Nick and his friends smash up motorcycles belonging to Johnny's friends. Nick's friends attack the rapping biker who fights back, leaving Nick and his buddies unconscious and Nick himself in the hospital with a broken nose.

Kathy's father, Gordon, becomes suspicious of Johnny, and warns Kathy to stay away from him because they can't trust strangers. The next day, Kathy goes for a ride with Johnny against her father's wishes. They ride all over town, including a construction site. When they finally return home, they are greeted by an angry Gordon, who coldly warns Johnny to stay away from his daughter.

Gordon, under pressure from his wife Grace, reveals to Kathy the secret of his past—he was once a police officer. They were on the run from two corrupt cops and were able to escape using fabricated documents, explaining why he kept his life a secret from Kathy all these years. Kathy criticizes her father, saying it was not fair that he lied to her in order to protect her, yet refuse to permit her to see a total stranger.

The next day, Johnny agrees to give Tommy, Kathy's younger brother, a ride on his bike. They cruise through the streets, and finally back to the Winslow home, where Tommy is later kidnapped. At the repair shop, the crew prepares to leave town since the bike has been repaired, but they tell Johnny to say goodbye to Kathy. When Johnny arrives at the Winslow house, he finds an envelope meant for the family. It turns out to be a message from the crooked cops with Tommy recording it. Fearing the worst, Gordon accuses Johnny of criminal involvement, much to Kathy's dismay.

When Kathy asks Johnny to play the tape left behind by the kidnappers, he hears a loud clanging noise from a construction vehicle, revealing the message was recorded at the construction site. The gang ambushes the kidnappers and rescue Tommy. When the police arrive, the gang return Tommy to the Winslows, and Gordon apologizes to Johnny. The rapper tells Kathy he has to move on, but she decides to follow him. Nick arrives in his car, telling Kathy to get used to being a biker chick because she will never see him again. Kathy holds on as Johnny uses the car as a ramp and the two new lovers ride off into the big city.

The film ends with Johnny reaching his destination, rapping "Get Wit It" and dancing with his crew to an audience at a night club. Kathy joins him on stage after the show is over, dancing alone in the spotlight.

Cast
 Vanilla Ice as John "Johnny" Van Owen
 Kristin Minter as Kathy Winslow
 Michael Gross as Gordon Winslow/Hackett...James Anthony Hackett Jimmy
 Deezer D as Jazz
 John Haymes Newton as Nick
 Candy Clark as Grace Winslow
 Victor DiMattia as Tommy Winslow
 Naomi Campbell as Singer
 Kathryn Morris as Jen
 Jack McGee as Clarke
 S.A. Griffin as Morrisey
 Sydney Lassick as Roscoe
 Dody Goodman as Mae
 Bobbie Brown as Monique
 Allison Dean as Princess

Production
Initial development for the film began after record executives at SBK learned about Ice Cube's involvement in Boyz n the Hood and wanted to create a film project for Vanilla Ice to capitalize on the success of his debut album. Filming began in April 1991. The role of Kathy was offered to Gwyneth Paltrow. Her father Bruce Paltrow advised against accepting it, as he felt it could hurt her career.

Music

The film's soundtrack album contained four new songs by Vanilla Ice, as well as other material. It peaked at No. 89 on the Billboard 200.

Reception
The film opened in 393 theaters in the United States, grossing $638,000, ranking at No. 14 among the week's new releases. Reviewers widely panned the film. Film website Rotten Tomatoes, which compiles reviews from a wide range of critics, gives the film a score of 3% based on reviews from 35 critics. Blender ranked Vanilla Ice's performance in the film as the seventh-worst performance by a musician turned actor. Director David Kellogg later disowned the film.

It was also mocked by RiffTrax in 2013.

Awards

References

External links

 
 
 
 

1991 films
1990s musical films
1990s romance films
1991 romantic comedy films
American musical comedy films
American romance films
American romantic comedy films
American romantic musical films
1990s English-language films
Films directed by David Kellogg
Films scored by Stanley Clarke
1990s hip hop films
Universal Pictures films
Vanilla Ice
1991 directorial debut films
Golden Raspberry Award winning films
Films about witness protection
1990s American films